Associazioen Sportiva Dilettantistica Torviscosa is an Italian association football club located in Torviscosa, Friuli-Venezia Giulia.

In the season 2010–11, from Serie D group C relegated to Eccellenza Friuli – Venezia Giulia.

Its colors are white and blue.

External links
Official Site

Football clubs in Italy
Football clubs in Friuli-Venezia Giulia
Association football clubs established in 1940
1940 establishments in Italy